Ellen Michaels is an American model and photographer.

She was Playboy magazine's Playmate of the Month for the March 1972 issue. Her centerfold was photographed by Dwight Hooker.

Michaels, who was getting a degree in elementary education at the time of her pictorial, went on to become a successful model for everything from advertising campaigns to covers of romance novels. She appears on record album covers for many artists including The Salsoul Orchestra, Eric Clapton, and Barrabás.

She also has donated much of her time to charity work with the disabled and senior citizens, and ran a volunteer program for the blind for many years. She is currently a wildlife and nature photographer, specializing in photos of the birds, butterflies, insects and landscapes of Central Park in New York City.

References

External links
 
 Ellen Michaels Wildlife & Nature Photos

1970s Playboy Playmates
1953 births
Living people
People from Queens, New York